Brigadier general is the Germanic variant of Brigadier general.

Belgium

Denmark
The rank was introduced in 1983, following the adaptation of the STANAG 2116.

Germany

, short BrigGen, is the lowest general officer rank in the German Army (Heer), German Air Force (Luftwaffe).

The rank is rated OF-6 in NATO, and is grade B6 in the pay rules of the Federal Ministry of Defence. It is equivalent to Flottillenadmiral in the German Navy (Marine) or to Generalarzt, Generalapotheker and Admiralarzt in the Zentraler Sanitätsdienst der Bundeswehr.

Rank insignia
On the shoulder straps (Heer, Luftwaffe) there is one golden pip (star) in golden oak leaves.

See also
 Comparative military ranks of World War I
 Comparative military ranks of World War II

References

Bibliography

 
 
 

Military ranks of Germany

de:Brigadegeneral